The United States Attorney for the Western District of Oklahoma is the chief federal law enforcement officer in forty Oklahoma counties. The U.S. District Court for the Western District of Oklahoma has jurisdiction over all cases prosecuted by the U.S. Attorney. Sanford Coats, who was appointed by Barack Obama in 2009 was the U.S. Attorney for the District until 2016.

Jurisdiction
Alfalfa, Beaver, Beckham, Blaine, Caddo, Canadian, Cimarron, Cleveland, Comanche, Cotton, Custer, Dewey, Ellis, 
Garfield, Garvin, Grady, Grant, Greer, Harmon, Harper, Jackson, Jefferson,
Kay, Kingfisher, Kiowa,
Lincoln, Logan, McClain, 
Major, Noble,
Oklahoma, Payne, Pottawatomie,
Roger Mills, Stephens, Texas, Tillman, Washita, Woods, and Woodward.  The court sits at Chickasha, Enid, Guthrie, Lawton, Mangum, Oklahoma City, Pauls Valley, Ponca City, Shawnee, and Woodward.

Organization
The Office is organized into divisions handling criminal and civil matters.

List of U.S. Attorneys for the Western District of Oklahoma
Timothy J. Downing:2019-2021
Mark A. Yancey: 2016–2019(Acting)
Sanford Coats: 2009–2016
Robert Troester: 2009
John Richter: 2005–2009
Robert McCampbell: 2001–2005
Daniel Webber: 1999–2001
Patrick Ryan: 1995–1999
Rozia McKinney-Foster: 1994–1995
Vicki Miles-LaGrange: 1993–1994
John Green: 1993
Joe Heaton: 1992–1993
Tim Leonard: 1989–1992
Robert Mydans: 1989
Bill Price: 1982–1989
John Green: 1982
David Russell: 1981–1982
Larry Patton: 1978–1981
John Green: 1977–78
David Russell: 1975–1977
Bill Burkett: 1969–1975
Andrew Potter: 1961–1969
Paul Cress: 1954–1961
Fred Mock: 1953–1954
Robert Shelton: 1947–1953
Charles Dierker: 1938–1947
William Lewis: 1934–1938
Herbert Hyde: 1931–1934
Roy St. Lewis: 1925–1931
William Maurer: 1921–1925
Robert Peck: 1920–1921
Frank Randell: 1920
John Fain: 1914–1920
Isaac Taylor: 1913–1914
Homer Boardman: 1912–1913
Isaac Taylor: 1912
John Embry: 1907–1912

References

External links
United States Attorney for the Western District of Oklahoma Official Website

Oklahoma law